The yellow jack is a species of offshore marine fish in the jack family.

Yellow Jack or Yellow Jack fever may also refer to:

 Yellow fever, an acute viral disease.
 Typhoid fever, a bacterial disease.
 Yellow Jack (play), a 1934 American play about the search for the causes and treatment of yellow fever.
 Yellow Jack, a 1938 film adaptation of the play.
 A yellow or yellow and black flag, or "jack", used to identify ships quarantined due to the presence of a disease.